The Men's 60 m wheelchair 1B was one of the events held in Athletics at the 1972 Summer Paralympics in Heidelberg.

There were 27 competitors in the heat; 5 made it into the final.

Baumgartner of West Germany won the gold medal.

Results

Heats

Final

References 

Wheelchair